Johann Jakob Scheuchzer (2 August 1672 – 23 June 1733) was a Swiss scholar born at Zürich.

Career
The son of the senior town physician (Archiater) of Zürich, he received his education in that place and, in 1692, went to the University of Altdorf near Nuremberg, being intended for the medical profession. Early in 1694, he took his degree of doctor in medicine at the University of Utrecht, and then returned to Altdorf, Germany to complete his mathematical studies. He went back to Zürich in 1696 and was made junior town physician (Poliater) with the promise of the professorship of mathematics which he duly obtained in 1710. He was promoted to the chair of physics, with the office of senior city physician, in January 1733, only a few months before his death on 23 June.

Published works
His published works (apart from numerous articles) were estimated at thirty-four in number. His historical writings are mostly still in manuscript. The more important of his published writings relate either to his scientific observations (all branches) or to his journeys, in the course of which he collected materials for these scientific works.

Scientific works
In the former category is his self-published Beschreibung der Naturgeschichte des Schweitzerlandes (3 vols., Zürich, 1706–1708), the third volume containing an account in German of his journey of 1705; a new edition of this book and, with important omissions, of his 1723 work, was issued, in 2 vols, in 1746, by JG Sulzer, under the title of Naturgeschichte des Schweitzerlandes sammt seinen Reisen über die schweitzerischen Gebirge, and his Helvetiae historia naturalis oder Naturhistorie des Schweitzerlandes (published in 3 vols, at Zürich, 1716–1718, and reissued in the same form in 1752, under the German title just given). The first of the three parts of the last-named work deals with the Swiss mountains (summing up all that was then known about them, and serving as a link between Simmler's work of 1574 and Gruner's of 1760), the second with the Swiss rivers, lakes and mineral baths, and the third with Swiss meteorology and geology.

Scheuchzer's works, as issued in 1746 and in 1752, formed (with Tschudi's Chronicum Helveticum) one of the chief sources for Schiller's drama Wilhelm Tell (1804). In 1704, Scheuchzer was elected FRS. He published many scientific notes and papers in the Philosophical Transactions for 1706–07, 1709 and 1727–28.

Travel works

In the second category are his Itinera alpina tria (made in 1702–04), which was published in London in 1708, and dedicated to the Royal Society, while the plates illustrating it were executed at the expense of various fellows of the society, including the president, Sir Isaac Newton (whose imprimatur appears on the title-page), Sir Hans Sloane, Dean Aldrich, Humfrey Wanley, etc. The text is written in Latin, as is that of the definitive work describing his travels (with which is incorporated the 1708 volume) that appeared in 1723 at Leiden, in four quarto volumes, under the title of Itinera per Helvetiae alpinas regiones facta annis 1702–11.

These journeys led Scheuchzer to almost every part of Switzerland, particularly its central and eastern districts. Apropos of his visit (1705) to the Rhône Glacier, he inserts a full account of the other Swiss glaciers, as far as they were then known, while in 1706, after mentioning certain wonders to be seen in the museum at Lucerne, he adds reports by men of good faith who had seen dragons in Switzerland. He doubts their existence, but illustrates the reports by fanciful representations of dragons, which have led some modern writers to depreciate his merits as a traveller and naturalist, for the belief in dragons was then widely spread.

In 1712 he published a map of Switzerland in four sheets (scale 1/290,000), of which the east portion (based on his personal observations) is far the most accurate, though the map as a whole was the best map of Switzerland till the end of the 18th century. At the end of his 1723 book he gives a full list (covering 27 quarto pages) of his writings from 1694 to 1721.

Scheuchzer is also known for his paleontological work. In his Lithographia Helvetica, he described fossils as "plays of nature" or alternately as leftovers from the biblical Flood. Most famously, he claimed that a fossilized skeleton found in a Baden quarry was the remains of a human who had perished in the deluge. This claim, which seemed to verify the claims of Christian scripture, was accepted for several decades after Scheuchzer's death, until 1811, when French naturalist Georges Cuvier re-examined the specimen and showed that it was actually a large prehistoric salamander.

Honours and awards
In November 1703, he was elected a Fellow of the Royal Society.

Scheuchzerhorn (3462 m) and Scheuchzerjoch in the Bernese Alps are named after Johann Jakob Scheuchzer. Scheuchzeriaceae and Scheuchzeria palustris are named in his honor.

References

 

See Franz Xaver Hoeherl, J.J. Scheuchzer, der Begründer d. phys. Geographie d. Hochgebirges (Munich, 1901), a useful little pamphlet, conveniently summarizing Scheuchzer's scientific views.

External links 

 
 Digitized copy of "Bibliotheca scriptorum historiæ naturali omnium terræ regionum inservientium" via John Carter Brown Library on Internet Archive 
 Digitized copy of "Physica sacra" Volume 1 (1731) via John Carter Brown Library on Internet Archive 
 Digitized copy of "Physica sacra" Volume 2 (1732) via John Carter Brown Library on Internet Archive 
 Digitized copy of "Physica sacra" Volume 3 (1733) via John Carter Brown Library on Internet Archive 
 Digitized copy of "Physica sacra" Volume 4 (1735) via John Carter Brown Library on Internet Archive 
 Herbarium diluvianum, 1723. 
 Herbarium diluvianum (1709) - full digital facsimile from the Linda Hall Library.
 Specimen lithographiae Helveticae... (1702) - full digital facsimile from the Linda Hall Library.
 Homo diluvii testis (1726) - full digital facsimile from the Linda Hall Library.
 Piscium querelae et vindiciae (1708) - full digital facsimile from the Linda Hall Library.
 Physica Sacra (1731) - Examples of engravings.
 Critical edition of part of Scheuchzer's correspondence, Project hallerNet.org, University of Bern 
 

1672 births
1733 deaths
People from Zürich
Swiss paleontologists
Utrecht University alumni
Fellows of the Royal Society